Men's 400m races for blind & visually impaired athletes at the 2004 Summer Paralympics were held in the Athens Olympic Stadium between 23 & 27 September. Events were held in three disability classes.

T11

The T11 event consisted of 3 heats, 2 semifinals and A & B finals. It was won by Jose Armando Sayovo, representing .

1st Round

Heat 1
25 Sept. 2004, 12:25

Heat 2
25 Sept. 2004, 12:32

Heat 3
25 Sept. 2004, 12:39

Semifinals
Heat 1
26 Sept. 2004, 18:20

Heat 2
26 Sept. 2004, 18:27

Final Round
Final A
27 Sept. 2004, 17:25

Final B
27 Sept. 2004, 17:20

T12

The T12 event consisted of 4 heats, 2 semifinals and A & B finals. It was won by Adekundo Adesoji, representing .

1st Round

Heat 1
23 Sept. 2004, 09:35

Heat 2
23 Sept. 2004, 09:42

Heat 3
23 Sept. 2004, 09:49

Heat 4
23 Sept. 2004, 09:56

Semifinals
Heat 1
24 Sept. 2004, 22:10

Heat 2
24 Sept. 2004, 22:17

Final Round
Final A
25 Sept. 2004, 20:00

Final B
25 Sept. 2004, 19:50

T13

The T13 event consisted of a single race. It was won by Royal Mitchell, representing .

Final Round
24 Sept. 2004, 18:10

References

M